Pembroke Parish is one of the nine parishes of Bermuda. It is named after English aristocrat William Herbert, 3rd Earl of Pembroke (1580–1630).

It occupies most of the short peninsula which juts from the central north coast of Bermuda's main island, and surrounds the city of Hamilton on three sides (the fourth being taken up by the shore of Hamilton Harbour). As such, its shape bears some passing resemblance to the county of Pembrokeshire in Wales. The peninsula juts into the eastern side of the Great Sound, the large expanse of water which dominates the geography of western Bermuda. In the east, Pembroke meets Devonshire Parish. As with most of Bermuda's parishes, it covers just over 2.3 square miles (about 6.0 km2 or 1500 acres). It had a population of 11,160 in 2016.

Natural features in Pembroke include Spanish Point, and Point Shares, as well as numerous small islands off Point Shares.

Other notable features of Pembroke include Fort Hamilton and Government House.

Pembroke Marsh East was designated a Ramsar site on 11 May 1999.

Education

Schools in Pembroke Parish
 St. John's Preschool (public preschool)
 Northlands Primary School (public primary school)
 Victor Scott Primary School (public primary school)
 In 2013 Michael Weeks, PLP, MP praised Victor Scott for making academic improvements. Weeks stated that the school is located in a community with a bad reputation.
 West Pembroke Primary School (public primary school)
 The Berkeley Institute (public senior school)
 Bermuda High School (private school)
 Saltus Grammar School (private school)

Schools in the City of Hamilton, in Pembroke Parish
 Dellwood Middle School (public middle school)
 Mount Saint Agnes Academy (private school)

Gallery

References

External links
Bermuda Online

 
Parishes of Bermuda
Ramsar sites in British Overseas Territories